Al-Shouleh Sports Club is a Syrian football club based in Daraa. It was founded in 1971. They play their home games at the Daraa Stadium.

References

Shouleh
Association football clubs established in 1971
1971 establishments in Syria